Chang Wen-ying (or Chang Wen-ing; ; born 26 July 1950) is a Taiwanese politician.

She was imprisoned for two years after performing plastic surgery on Shih Ming-teh, who was attempting to flee Taiwan shortly after the Kaohsiung Incident. After her release, Chang ran unsuccessfully for a seat on the National Assembly in 1986. With the help of Taichung mayor Chen Tuan-tang, Chang was elected to the Taiwan Provincial Consultative Council (TPCC) in 1989. She married Chen's son Chen Wen-hsien in 1990. Upon the end of her second term on the TPCC, Chang served as Mayor of Taichung from 1997 to 2001. She left the Democratic Progressive Party run an independent mayoral campaign in 2001, after finishing low in opinion polls. Her bid for reelection split the Pan-Green Coalition vote between herself and Michael Tsai, allowing Jason Hu to win.

References

1950 births
Mayors of Taichung
Living people
Democratic Progressive Party (Taiwan) politicians
Taipei Medical University alumni
Kaohsiung Medical University alumni
Women mayors of places in Taiwan
Chung Shan Medical University alumni